The 2020 FIA European Rallycross Championship was the 45th season of the FIA European Rallycross Championship. The season consisted of two rounds across two categories; Supercar and Super1600. The season commenced on 22 August at the Höljesbanan, Höljes, Sweden and finished prematurely on the 6 October at Biķernieku Kompleksā Sporta Bāze in Riga, Latvia.

Calendar
The provisional calendar was unveiled on 30 October 2019. 
The season was originally scheduled to start in April but following multiple postponements relating to the COVID-19 pandemic, a revised calendar was released in May 2020 and the championship is now scheduled to begin in August.

Calendar changes
Euro RX of Portugal was set to return after a 1-year hiatus, but was cancelled due to the COVID-19 pandemic.
Euro RX of Great Britain was omitted from the schedule.
Euro RX of Russia was supposed to join the calendar, but was cancelled and replaced with the Euro RX of Germany (which moved from the Estering to the Nürburgring).
Euro RX of Barcelona, Euro RX of Portugal, Euro RX of Benelux, Euro RX of Sweden, and Euro RX of Germany were originally scheduled for between April and August. All were rescheduled due to the COVID-19 pandemic.
Euro RX of Norway and Euro RX of Germany were dropped from the calendar following the May calendar revision.
Euro RX of France was cancelled, also as a result of the COVID-19 pandemic.
Euro RX of Germany was to return on the final revision of the calendar, but it was cancelled, due to spikes in COVID-19 cases in Germany, resulting in an early end to the 2020 season
After being rescheduled twice, Euro RX of Benelux was cancelled due to Belgium going into national lockdown.

Entry list

Supercar

Super1600

Results and standings

Championship points are scored as follows:

A red background denotes drivers who did not advance from the round

Supercar

1 – 10 point penalty.
2 – 15 point penalty.

Super1600

References

External links 

European Rallycross Championship seasons
European Rallycross Championship
FIA European Rallycross Championship
FIA European Rallycross Championship